José Luís Marques Peixoto (born September 4, 1974) is a Portuguese author, poet and playwright. A professional writer since 2001, his works have been translated into more than 30 languages.

Biography
José Luis Peixoto was born in the village of Galveias, in the Portuguese region of Alentejo. He lived in Galveias until the age of 18. He obtained a bachelor's degree in modern languages and literature from NOVA University Lisbon. After university, he was a teacher for some years in several schools in Portugal and Cape Verde, before becoming a professional writer in 2001.

Peixoto's first book, Morreste-me (English title: You Died on Me), was published in 2000. In 2001, he became the youngest ever recipient of the José Saramago Prize, at the age of 27, for his novel Nenhum Olhar.

International editions
Translated editions of Peixoto's books are available from the following publishers: Bloomsbury (UK), Doubleday, Random House (US), Grasset, Seuil (France), Literatura Random House (Spanish-speaking countries), Companhia das Letras (Brazil), Einaudi (Italy), Kedros (Greece), Meulenhoff, Atlas Contact (Nederlands), Kineret (Israel), Wsoy (Finland), Polirom (Romania), Bozicevic (Croatia), Bakur Sulakauri (Georgia), Kontrast (Serbia), among others.

Awards 
2001: José Saramago Prize, for Nenhum Olhar (best novel published in all Portuguese speaking countries on the two previous years)
2007: Prémio Cálamo, for Cemitério de Pianos (best foreign novel published in Spain in 2007)
2008: Prémio de Poesia Daniel Faria, for Gaveta de Papéis (best poetry book published in Portugal by a poet under 35 years old)
2013: Prémio da Sociedade Portuguesa de Autores, for A Criança em Ruínas (best poetry book published in Portugal on the previous year)
2013: Prémio Salerno Libro d'Europa, for Livro (best novel published in Europe in 2012)
2016: Oceanos Prize, for Galveias (best novel published in all Portuguese-speaking countries in 2015)
2019: The Best Translation Award-Japan for Galveias (best foreign novel translated into Japanese in 2019)

Bibliography

Novels 
 2000: Nenhum Olhar (English titles: Blank Gaze (UK), The Implacable Order of Things (US))
 2002: Uma Casa na Escuridão 
 2006: Cemitério de Pianos (English title: The Piano Cemetery)
 2010: Livro
 2014: Galveias 
 2015: Em Teu Ventre 
 2019: Autobiografia

Short-novels/fictional narrative 

 2000: Morreste-me (English title: You Died on Me)
 2003: Antídoto 
 2008: Cal 
 2011: Abraço

Poetry 
 2001: A Criança em Ruínas
 2002: A Casa, a Escuridão
 2008: Gaveta de Papéis
2020: Regresso a Casa

Travel literature 
 2012: Dentro do Segredo: Uma viagem na Coreia do Norte 
 2017: O Caminho Imperfeito

Children's literature 

 2012: A Mãe que Chovia
 2016: Todos os Escritores do Mundo Têm a Cabeça Cheia de Piolhos

References

External links 
Official website 
Travel website (in Portuguese)
Peixoto at Bloomsbury

1974 births
Living people
People from Ponte de Sor
21st-century Portuguese poets
Portuguese male poets
Portuguese male novelists
21st-century Portuguese dramatists and playwrights
Portuguese songwriters
Male songwriters
Portuguese male dramatists and playwrights
21st-century Portuguese male writers